The Palazzo Moroni is a palace located on Via Porta #12 in the historic center of the upper town of Bergamo, Italy. The palace is a civic art museum, as well as used for cultural functions. The building, noted for its Baroque interior decorations, is presently managed by the Fondazione di Palazzo Moroni in conjunction with the city after a donation by Count Antonio Moroni.

The exterior is plain and faces a narrow steep street. Construction of the palace was commissioned by Francesco Moroni. The Moroni family had bought a homes at this site in the second half of the 16th century. After his marriage to Lucrezia Roncalli in 1631, he began construction of the Palace on the ground of Porta Penta. Construction went on until 1666.

In 1649 Francesco contracted Giovanni Giacomo Barbelli to fresco the rooms of the interiors. Over the next century, further decorations were added including ceilings depicting The Age of Gold, The Fall of the Giants, and Hercules on a Chariot. The main ball room depicts stories from Torquato Tasso’s Gerusalemme Liberata. The entrance stairway was frescoed by Paolo Vincenzo Bonomini. Among the works displayed in the palace are works by Giovanni Battista Moroni, Bernardino Luini, Giovanni Giacomo Barbelli, Giuseppe Roncelli, and Cesare Tallone.

The interior opens up to an inner garden with terraces.

References

Museums in Bergamo
Buildings and structures in Bergamo
Palaces in Lombardy
Gardens in Lombardy